Inhun High School is a high school in the Gwanak District of South Korea, under Gwanaksan. It is famous for its road with Cherry blossom. Because of its closeness to Seoul National University Inhun High school has some relations with the university.

Symbols
Hello Moto
Strong Revolution
Small Stature
Great hotdogs

School Symbol
Inhun: by locating the ground near Nakseongdae where General Gang Gam-chan was born, try to success his spirit and to educate students who are going to work for their country. "Inhun" is his posthumous name,
Round and white background: symbol of the universe and smoothness,
Green diamond: symbol of lofty personality and peace,
Golden circumference: symbol of nobility and braveness.

School Flower
Forsythia: Korean representative Deciduous of hope and happiness in spring(Korea). It blooms before the leaf comes out in April. It shows positive personality pursuing community spirit.

School Tree
Zelkova serrata means great spirit and virtue.

History

References 
School promotion video: 
School site: 

High schools in Seoul
Gwanak District
Educational institutions established in 1985
1985 establishments in South Korea